Ibrahim Mahama (born in 1987) is a Ghanaian author and an artist of monumental installations. He lives and works in Tamale, Ghana.

Education 
He obtained a Master of Fine Arts degree in Painting and Sculpture in 2013 and a bachelor of Fine Arts degree in Painting in 2010 at the Kwame Nkrumah University of Science and Technology, Kumasi, Ghana.

Career 

He often works with found objects by transforming them in his practice and giving them new meanings. Mahama is best known for draping buildings in old jute sacks which he stitches together with a team of collaborators to create patchwork quilts. He was the youngest artist featured in the Ghana Pavilion at the 2019 Venice Biennale. His work was shown during the 56th International Art Exhibition of the Venice Biennale in Italy All The World’s Futures curated by Okwui Enwezor in 2015.

Mahama shows his works in Ghanaian markets, as well as galleries. This is intended to provide a critical reflection on the value system inherent to his materials. He is also a painter and sculptor.

In 2013, Stefan Simchowitz, along with Dublin gallerist Ellis King, sued Mahama. Mahama had been paid by the dealers, but refused to authenticate derivative works they produced from Mahama's installations of Ghanaian coal sacks. In 2016, Simchowitz settled with Mahama.

In 2019, he started the Savannah Center for Contemporary Art (SCCA), Tamale. Mahama also repurposed 120 scratched second-class train seats through a parliament he calls the "parliament of ghost", a replica of Ghana's parliament chamber. The parliament of ghost was installed at the Whitworth Art gallery in Manchester. 

As part of his contribution to the development of Africa through art, Mahama was named the 73rd most influential African by theafricareport.com in the list of 100 most influential Africans 2019/2020

Solo exhibitions

Further reading

References

External links 
Profile on the White Cube site

Living people
1987 births
People from Tamale, Ghana
21st-century Ghanaian artists
Kwame Nkrumah University of Science and Technology alumni
Installation artists
Ghanaian male artists
Pope John Senior High School and Minor Seminary alumni